Aniruddh Kumar Yadav is an Indian politician. He was elected to the Bihar Legislative Assembly from Bakhtiarpur as the 2010 Member of Bihar Legislative Assembly as a member of the Rashtriya Janata Dal.

References

External links
(serial no-180)
 Governance
 Map

People from Patna
Rashtriya Janata Dal politicians
Living people
Bihar MLAs 2010–2015
Bihar MLAs 2020–2025
Year of birth missing (living people)